General Wall may refer to:

John F. Wall (born 1931), U.S. Army lieutenant general
Peter Wall (British Army officer) (born 1955), British Army general
Ricardo Wall (1694–1777), Spanish-Irish cavalry captain general

See also
Peter Walls (1927–2010), Rhodesian Army lieutenant general
General Wahl (disambiguation)